Marco Tarchi (born October 11, 1952 in Rome) is an Italian political scientist. He is currently full professor of Political Science, Political Theory and Political Communication at the Cesare Alfieri School of Political Sciences of the University of Florence. His research is focused primarily on populism, democracy, political organization, and extreme right.

He obtained his Ph.D. in Political Science at the University of Florence in 1987. In the same university, he was an assistant professor with tenure in Political Science from 1993 to 1998 and then an associate professor from 1998 to 2001. He has been a full professor since 2001. He was also a visiting professor at the universities of Turku (1993, 1996–1998, 2003, 2007), Santiago and Viña del Mar (2004), and del Rosario (2008).

Bibliography 
 Partito unico e dinamica autoritaria, Naples: Akropolis, 1981
 La "rivoluzione legale", Bologna: Il Mulino, 1993
 "Destra e sinistra: due essenze introvabili", in Democrazia e diritto, 1, 1994, pp. 381–396
 Cinquant'anni di nostalgia. La destra italiana dopo il fascismo. Milan: Rizzoli, 1995 (interview of Antonio Carioti)
 Esuli in patria. I fascisti nell'Italia repubblicana. Parma: Guanda, 1995
 The Dissatisfied Society. The Roots of Political Change in Italy, in European Journal of Political Research, 1, 1996, pp. 41–63
 Italy: the Northern League, in L. de Winter and H. Türsan (eds), Regionalist Parties in Western Europe. London: Routledge, 1998
 Estrema destra e neopopulismo in Europa, in Rivista Italiana di Scienza Politica, 2, 1998
 Italy: Early Crisis and Collapse, in D. Berg-Schlosser and J. Mitchell (eds), Conditions of Democracy in Europe, 1918–1938. London: Macmillan, 2000.
 L' Italia populista. Dal qualunquismo ai girotondi, il Mulino, 2003, 
 Il fascismo. Teorie, interpretazioni, modelli, Bari: Laterza, 2003
 Contro l'americanismo, Laterza Bari: Laterza, 2004
 La rivoluzione impossibile. Dai Campi Hobbit alla nuova Destra, Florence: Vallecchi, 2010
 Italia populista. Dal qualunquismo a Beppe Grillo, Bologna: Il Mulino, 2014

References

External links 
 Personal page at University of Florence 

1952 births
Living people
Academic staff of the University of Florence
University of Florence alumni
Italian political scientists